Claire Josephine Scanlan (born 21 February 1972) is an Irish soccer coach and former midfielder for the Republic of Ireland women's national football team. She played for clubs in the American W-League, the Japanese L. League and the English FA Women's Premier League.

Club career
Scanlan began playing with Rush Athletic as an 11-year-old. While attending St. Joseph's Secondary School Scanlan also played camogie and cricket. She became the first female to play hurling at Croke Park with the school team, and marked the occasion with a goal.

After six seasons with Rush Athletic, Scanlan moved to Dublin rivals Swords Celtic. She returned to Rush Athletic and won Leinster Senior League Division Two honours with the club in 1990–91. In 1992 Scanlan took up a soccer scholarship to Mercyhurst College in Pennsylvania. She was selected to the All-American team in 1994 and 1995 and was named both Division II Player of the Year and Conference Player of the Year.

After graduating Scanlan signed a full-time professional contract to play for OKI F.C. Winds, a club in Japan's L. League. She returned to Ireland for a brief spell with Shelbourne, before heading back to America in August 1999. She won a W-League title with Springfield Sirens in 2000, before turning out for Memphis Mercury (2001 and 2002) and Boston Renegades (2003). Meanwhile, Scanlan had joined Leeds United and was playing for the Yorkshire club in the FA Women's Premier League National Division during the winter season.

After three seasons at Leeds, Scanlan joined Bristol Rovers as player-assistant manager to Gary Green.

International career
Scanlan made her debut for the Republic of Ireland in an Under–18 fixture against Northern Ireland in 1989. She scored both goals in the Republic's 2–0 win at Tolka Park.

In February 2000 Scanlan was named the 1999 FAI Women's Senior International Player of the Year.

She won a total of 57 senior caps and scored seven goals before retiring in 2009. In February of that year a half-time presentation during the Irish men's national team World Cup qualifier against Georgia at Croke Park recognised Scanlan's contribution to Irish football.

Coaching career

While playing for Bristol Academy, Scanlan was employed as the head coach of the Female Football Development Centre at South Gloucestershire and Stroud College. She left to take up a post as assistant coach at Troy University, where she had previously worked as a graduate coach between 1999 and 2001 while completing a Master's degree in Education.

Scanlan is also on the coaching staff of the FAI and was an assistant coach of the Irish team who reached the quarter-finals of the 2010 FIFA U-17 Women's World Cup.

References

1972 births
Living people
Republic of Ireland women's association footballers
Leeds United Women F.C. players
Bristol Academy W.F.C. players
Republic of Ireland women's international footballers
FA Women's National League players
Irish expatriate sportspeople in Japan
Expatriate women's footballers in England
Expatriate women's soccer players in the United States
Expatriate women's footballers in Japan
USL W-League (1995–2015) players
Republic of Ireland expatriate association footballers
OKI FC Winds players
Nadeshiko League players
Irish expatriate sportspeople in England
Irish expatriate sportspeople in the United States
Shelbourne F.C. (women) players
Dublin Women's Soccer League players
Mercyhurst Lakers women's soccer players
Women's association football midfielders
Republic of Ireland women's youth international footballers
Boston Renegades players